Saidahtam Rahimov (born 28 June 1973) is a Tajikistani judoka. He competed in the men's heavyweight event at the 1996 Summer Olympics.

References

External links

1973 births
Living people
Tajikistani male judoka
Olympic judoka of Tajikistan
Judoka at the 1996 Summer Olympics
Place of birth missing (living people)
Judoka at the 1998 Asian Games
Asian Games competitors for Tajikistan
20th-century Tajikistani people
21st-century Tajikistani people